The 2000 meter steeplechase is a rarely run senior athletics and a standard youth athletics event for the steeplechase in track and field. The event is part of the athletics programme for boys and girls at the IAAF World Youth Championships in Athletics. It is an obstacle race over the distance of 2000 metres, and derives its name from the horse racing steeplechase.

All-time top 25
i = indoor performance
A = affected by altitude

Men
Correct as of 12 September 2022.

Notes
Below is a list of all other times equal or superior to 5:20.12:
Bouabdellah Tahri also ran 5:15.36 (2009), 5:15.96 (2002), 5:17.19 (2007), 5:19.33 (2001).
Paul Kipsiele Koech also ran 5:17.04  (2010).
John Langat also ran 5:18.61 (2001).
Eliud Barngetuny also ran 5:18.67 (1995).
Alessandro Lambruschini also ran 5:18.68 (1990), 5:18.88 (1992), 5:19.44 (1992).
Richard Kosgei also ran 5:19.05 (1995).
Antonio David Jiménez also ran 5:20.07 (2001).

Women
Correct as of September 2022.

Notes
Below is a list of all other times equal or superior to 6:13.97:
Maruša Mišmaš-Zrimsek also run 5:48.71 (2021), 5:56.28 (2020).
Winfred Yavi also ran 5:48.68 (2020), 5:56.83 (2019).
Gesa-Felicitas Krause also ran 6:04.20 (2015), 6:09.46 (2016), 6:10.91 (2021).
Mercy Chepkurui also ran 6:10.99 (2021).
Roseline Chepngetich also ran 6:12.0   (2013).
Fancy Cherono also ran 6:13.77 (2020).

References

Events in track and field
Steeplechase (athletics)
Middle-distance running